Skitholvola or Sjettholvola is a mountain in the municipality of Verdal in Trøndelag county, Norway.

References

External links

Verdal
Mountains of Trøndelag